Stephen Kim may refer to:

 Stephen Jin-Woo Kim (born 1967), former State Department worker
 Stephen Keysuk Kim, marketing academic
 Stephen Kim Sou-hwan (1922–2009), Roman Catholic Cardinal and Archbishop of Seoul